Mary Joe Frug (1941 – April 4, 1991) was a professor at New England Law Boston from 1981 to 1991. She is considered a forerunner of legal postmodern feminist theory, and was a renowned postmodernist and feminist legal scholar.  Much of her work was collected in the posthumously-published book Postmodern Legal Feminism. She authored the casebook Women and the Law.

On April 4, 1991, Frug was murdered on the streets of Cambridge, Massachusetts, near the home that she shared with her husband, Harvard Law professor Gerald Frug, and their two children. The murder remains unsolved.

Harvard Law Review controversy
In March 1992, the Harvard Law Review published an unfinished draft article by Frug called "A Postmodern Feminist Legal Manifesto," which explored the legal theories on violence toward women. Some members of the Review were opposed to publishing the piece, and later, on the anniversary of her murder, parodied it in He-Manifesto of Post-Mortem Legal Feminism, which was included in the Harvard Law Revue, an annual spoof of the Review. It was signed by "Mary Doe, Rigor-Mortis Professor of Law" and argued that Frug's theories were the concoction of paranoid feminists. Co-authors Craig Coben and Ken Fenyo later apologized in a statement, particularly to Frug's husband. They added that they did not mean to distribute the article on the anniversary of her death. The statement was signed by other members of the Review, including the then-Supreme Court editor Paul Clement.  Her views were considered especially infuriating by Harvard law professor Alan Dershowitz, who railed against her audacity, and stirred up strong sentiment against her among his students. According to The New York Times:

Legacy
Frug's casebook, Women and the Law, is still in publication, and is now known as Mary Joe Frug's Women and the Law.

New England Law Boston houses the "Professor Mary Joe Frug Women and the Law Collection" at its library.

The Women's Law Caucus at the New England Law established the Mary Joe Frug Grant to provide "stipends for students at New England who devote their summers to improving the lives of women."

In 1994 the Mary Joe Frug Fund was launched to establish an endowed chair at New England Law in her memory. This chair would be the first of its kind in the nation and would carry on the legacy of Professor Frug by allowing visiting professors to come to the New England Law and teach women's issues in the law.

Frug's murder remains unsolved. In 2019, a newly-formed cold case unit in Middlesex County, Massachusetts took up the case.

See also
List of unsolved murders

References

Further reading
 Minow, Martha. (1992). "Incomplete Correspondence: An Unsent Letter to Mary Joe Frug." Harvard Law Review, 105(5):1096-1105

1941 births
1991 deaths
1991 murders in the United States
20th-century American lawyers
20th-century American educators
20th-century American women educators
20th-century American writers
20th-century American women writers
American legal scholars
American murder victims
Female murder victims
History of women in Massachusetts
Lawyers from Cambridge, Massachusetts
New England Law Boston faculty
People murdered in Massachusetts
Postmodern feminists
Unsolved murders in the United States
Violence against women in the United States